Operation USA (also known as OpUSA, Operation California, or OpCal) is a non profit humanitarian organization supporting health, education and relief programs at home and abroad in order to help children and families recover and thrive in the wake of disasters. Working with grassroots community organizations, OpUSA strives to help the most overlooked and under-served communities. It is exclusively privately funded, receiving no assistance from the United States federal government. OPUSA had a revenue of over $2.6 million in fiscal year 2019, and since 1979 has delivered more than $400 million in aid to 100 countries.

Awards and affiliations
Operation USA was part of the International Campaign to Ban Landmines in 1997 when it won the Nobel Peace Prize. Operation California was also the winner of the 1983 President's Volunteer Action Award. Operation USA has been named one of America's Best 100 Charities by Worth Magazine and, in October 2008, was named the top-rated "exclusively privately funded charity in the U.S." by Charity Navigator. Operation USA collaborated with NASA's Jet Propulsion Laboratory and the US National Laboratories at Lawrence Livermore and Los Alamos to develop new approaches to land mine detection, is a member of InterAction, and is an AlertNet news partner. In 2014 Operation USA's CEO Richard M. Walden received the Honeywell Hometown Hero Award from the Honeywell Corp.

History 
Operation California began in 1979 as "a relief organization created to provide aid to Vietnamese Boat People and Cambodian refugees", co-founded by Richard Walden (still active as President & CEO) and Llewellyn Werner (who left in early 1980). The organization flew "the first international relief airlift to Cambodia since 1975", delivering medicine to Phnom-Penh. Operation California had airlifted more than $3 million worth of aid by October 1979.

In 1982, Operation California sent "the first private airlift from the U.S. to Poland", delivering 200,000 lbs. of medical supplies and medicine; that year Operation California also airlifted medical supplies to Lebanon. In 1983, Operation California delivered aid to the children of Vietnam and Cambodia. Operation California provided aid to the earthquake victims in Mexico City in 1985, as well as working in cooperation with the Unitarian Universalist Service Committee and Oxfam America, to deliver $250,000 worth of medical aid to Nicaragua. In 1986 Operation California, in conjunction with Medical Aid to El Salvador, sent "[t]wo cargo planes carrying $500,000 worth of relief supplies to earthquake-stricken El Salvador". In 1988, Operation California began using the name Operation USA because it better described the effort and intent of the organization to represent the entire American people. In 1989 Operation USA facilitated operations on children in Vietnam who had cleft palates by a Los Angeles-based plastic surgeon, Dr Stanley Frileck.

Medical aid and rebuilding effort was delivered to Mexico in 1990, by OPUSA. In 1991 OPUSA delivered aid to Bangladesh. OpUSA delivered aid to war torn Somali's in 1993. In 1994 OpUSA provided earthquake relief. In 1999 the organization provided aid to Hurricane Mitch survivors in Honduras and Nicaragua. In 1999 also OpUSA supplied aid to storm victims in Mexico.

In 2003 OpUSA delivered aid to Iraq War victims in the Persian Gulf. The tsunami victims in Sri Lanka and Indonesia were aided by OpUSA in 2004, as well as the Mexico City flood victims. In 2008, OpUSA has delivered aid to Myanmar cyclone victims as well as Chinese earthquake victims and flood victims in the Midwest, USA. In 2015, OpUSA partnered with UniversalGiving and United Airlines to raise funds for its Nepal Earthquake recovery project, rebuilding a school in Fyakse, in the Dhading district. In 2017, OpUSA launched relief efforts helping communities impacted by an unprecedented string of disasters, including Hurricane Harvey, Hurricane Maria and Hurricane Irma, and California wildfires. In 2018, OpUSA delivered cash grants and supplies to aid communities impacted by Hurricanes Florence and Michael in the eastern US.

In 2020, OpUSA began responding to the COVID-19 pandemic in the United States by delivering cash and supplies to partners aiding front line workers.

Celebrity affiliates 
Operation USA,  These include  These promotions have featured: 
Barbra Streisand
Bonnie Raitt
Carol Burnett
Crosby, Stills & Nash
Don Henley
Ed Asner
Frank Sinatra
Jack Elliot
Jackson Browne
James Garner
John Denver
Julie Andrews
Kirk Douglas
Michael Jackson
New American Orchestra
Plácido Domingo
Ricardo Montalbán
Ry Cooder
Sharon Stone
The Buena Vista Social Club
Tony Adams
Rosario Dawson travelled with Operation USA to Nicaragua in 2008.

Film and theater projects
Operation USA also relies on film and theater promotions to generate funds that pay for aid, including:
Because We Care (CBS Television Special)
Beyond Borders (Hollywood)
Buena Vista Social Club (Hollywood & Havana)

Roll Bounce
The Killing Fields (Hollywood & Cambodia)

References

External links 
www.opusa.org

Charities based in California
Development charities based in the United States
International charities
Humanitarian aid organizations
Organizations established in 1979